The G7es (TXI) "Zaunkönig II" was a torpedo developed for German U-boats during World War II. This evolution of the G7es torpedo was created to counter the Allies' Foxer noise-maker countermeasure. This weapon was never actually employed in wartime as Germany had surrendered by the time testing was fully completed.

Of the 16 torpedoes salvaged from the wreck in 1993 at least three were TXI's. One torpedo was restored and is currently on display alongside the U-boat in the United Kingdom, while the rest were picked for parts and blown up.

See also
 G7e torpedo
 List of World War II torpedoes of Germany

References

External links
A brief synopsis of German torpedo evolution during World War II at uboat.net

World War II torpedoes of Germany